The Church of Holy Apostles Peter and Paul, known as the Cave Church (Pećinska crkva), is a Serbian Orthodox cave-church located on eastern slope of Mount Kopaonik near Lukovo, southern Serbia. it was built by the Serbian King Milutin (1282 - 1321) in the 14th century and is dedicated to Saints Peter and Paul. It is part of the Monastery of St. Archangel Gabriel.

References

14th-century Serbian Orthodox church buildings
Serbian Orthodox church buildings in Serbia
Caves of Serbia
Medieval Serbian architecture
Kuršumlija
Cave churches